The Mark of the Beast is a 1980 Dutch drama film directed by Pieter Verhoeff. It is based on the life of IJje Wijkstra who in 1929 murdered four police officers. 

The film won the first Golden Calf for Best Feature Film award at the 1981 Netherlands Film Festival. Marja Kok also won the Golden Calf for Best Actress for her role in the film.

Plot
Mason IJje Wijkstra starts a relationship with Aaltje Botter, a married woman with 6 children, in a time when adultery was illegal.

Cast
 Gerard Thoolen as IJje Wijkstra
 Marja Kok as Aaltje Botter
 Peter Faber as Durk Tabak
 Joop Admiraal as pastor

References

External links 
 

1980 films
Dutch drama films
1980s Dutch-language films
1980 drama films
Films directed by Pieter Verhoeff